Sindhu known by her stage name Sindhu Loknath, is an Indian actress and model. She made her debut in films, with a cameo role in Parichaya (2009). She is recognized for her performances in Lifeu Ishtene (2011), Drama (2012), Case No. 18/9 (2013) and Love in Mandya (2014).

Early life
Born as Sindhu in Bangalore in the Indian state of Karnataka, Sindhu Loknath was born into what she calls "an extremely conservative family". She obtained a Master of Science degree in Biotechnology from Reva University Bangalore.She Pre-domoninantly acts on Kannada movies. She took to acting and made her debut appearing in a cameo role in the 2009 Kannada film Parichaya.

Career
Following her first screen appearance in Parichaya, Sindhu was cast as Nandini by director Pawan Kumar in his film Lifeu Ishtene, that released in 2011. Sindhu got recognized for her performance in the film. Around this time, she appeared in cameo roles in Telugu and Tamil films such as Allam Vellulli (2009), Vaada Poda Nanbargal (2011) and Muppozhudhum Un Karpanaigal (2012). In the 2012 comedy film Drama directed by Yogaraj Bhat, she was cast as Chandrika, a mute girl and the love interest of a character played by Sathish Ninasam. The film emerged as a success with its ensemble cast including Sindhu receiving critical praise. For her performance in the film she earned nominations for Filmfare Award for Best Supporting Actress – Kannada and SIIMA Award for Best Actress in a Supporting Role. In the same year, she appeared in Yaare Koogadali in a supporting role.

She was a model for print and corporate ads like Nelli Silks, Samyak, Lawerence and Mayo, Assendas India, Radio One, Arogya Milk, Lancer and Developers, Canara Bank. She played the love interest of Aneesh Tejeshwar in three consecutive releases, Coffee with My Wife, Nan Life Alli and Endendu Ninagagi. She is being paired with Ajay Rao in Jai Bajrangabali.

Filmography

Films

Webseries
Loose Connection

References

External links 
 
 

Living people
Actresses in Kannada cinema
Actresses in Tamil cinema
Actresses in Tulu cinema
Indian film actresses
21st-century Indian actresses
Actresses from Bangalore
People from Kodagu district
1987 births